The acronym LOTH can stand for:

 Language of thought hypothesis
 Liturgy of the Hours

See also
Loth (disambiguation)